Valley Bend is a census-designated place (CDP) in Randolph County, West Virginia, United States. Valley Bend has a post office with ZIP code 26293. As of the 2010 census, its population was 485.

The community was named for a nearby meander in the Tygart Valley River.

References

Census-designated places in Randolph County, West Virginia
Census-designated places in West Virginia